is a high school in Japan. The traditional school uniform is a basic black gakuran with brass buttons while the summer version consists of gray pants and a white shirt. The school is divided into three semesters in a typical year of studies. Gas pumps are used for the purpose of heating and air conditioning the entire school. This school also has consistently maintained a boys-only policy despite an increased number of gender equality measures being carried out.

References

 Official web site

See also

 List of high schools in Japan

Boys' schools in Japan
Educational institutions established in 1889
High schools in Tokyo
1889 establishments in Japan